The yellow-legged weaver (Ploceus flavipes) is a species of bird in the family Ploceidae.
It is endemic to Democratic Republic of the Congo.

Its natural habitat is subtropical or tropical moist lowland forests.
It is threatened by habitat loss.

References

External links
BirdLife Species Factsheet.

yellow-legged weaver
Endemic birds of the Democratic Republic of the Congo
Vulnerable animals
Vulnerable biota of Africa
yellow-legged weaver
yellow-legged weaver
Taxonomy articles created by Polbot